Theretra lycetus, the white-edged hunter hawkmoth, is a moth of the family Sphingidae. It was described by Pieter Cramer in 1775.

Distribution 
Is known from south-east Asia, including Malaysia, Thailand, India, Sri Lanka and Indonesia.

Description
The abdomen upperside has pale longitudinal double lines, which become indistinct posteriorly. The forewing upperside is similar to Theretra japonica, but the contrast between the darker postmedian lines and intervening pale bands is stronger. The hindwing upperside has a reddish median band of variable width.

References

Theretra
Moths described in 1775
Taxa named by Pieter Cramer